A delivery robot is an autonomous robot that provides "last mile" delivery services. An operator may monitor and take control of the robot remotely in certain situations that the robot cannot resolve by itself such as when it is stuck in an obstacle. Delivery robots can be used in different settings such as food delivery, package delivery, hospital delivery, and room service.

Applications

Food delivery
Deployments of food delivery robots were in a small scale prior to the COVID-19 pandemic. By January 2019, there were some deployments on United States college campuses. George Mason University became the first university campus that incorporated on-demand food deliveries by robots as part of its meal plan with 25 robot fleet from Starship Technologies. As the pandemic continued on, demands for food deliveries had increased significantly. This caused the demands for food delivery robots in college campuses to surge as well. Starship and other companies such as Kiwibot deployed hundreds of food delivery robots to several college campuses and some city streets in the United States and United Kingdom. Food delivery service companies also added delivery robots to their platform. For example, Grubhub partnered with Yandex to provide services in colleges. Limitations of using food delivery robots includes inability to accommodate special delivery requests such as leaving the food at the door, and inability to navigate difficult terrains. This may require remote operators to help the robots to navigate around obstacles.

Grocery delivery

In April 2018, Starship Technologies launched its groceries delivery service in Milton Keynes, England, in partnership with supermarket chains The Co-op and Tesco. By November 2020, said Starship Technologies, Milton Keynes had the "world's largest autonomous robot fleet".

Early 2022 saw the opening of Nourish + Bloom, the first African American-owned autonomous grocery store in the world.The new store processes transactions using computer vision equipment in tandem with artificial intelligence-based voice and gesture technology. Nourish + Bloom offers delivery service using robotic vehicles supplied by Daxbot. That startup, which is based in Philomath, Oregon, and raising investments through a crowdfunding campaign, has developed a unit that can travel up to 10 miles at 4 mph and has a temperature-controlled cargo space.

Package delivery

In January 2019, Amazon launched an experimental service to deliver small packages to their Amazon Prime customers using delivery robots called Amazon Scout. The test was done in Seattle region and expanded to Irvine California, Atlanta, and Franklin in Tennessee. In 2021, after testing of package delivery robots had been done in 4 U.S. cities, Amazon created a new development center in Finland to make further advancement in the technology in order for their robots to better handle real-life navigations.

Hospital delivery

Delivery robots can perform several tasks in hospital settings to reduce operational costs. The first set of tasks are for food, medical specimens, and medicine deliveries. With multiple sensors, the delivery robots can navigate the interior layout of the hospitals. They also have an electronic signal that can request an elevator ride to be able to work in multi-story buildings. With security concerns, some delivery robots are equipped with code and a biometric fingerprint scan to prevent unauthorized access to the contents inside the robots.  there were more than 150 hospitals in the United States and elsewhere that deployed the delivery robots. The second set of tasks is to deliver soiled linen carts and medical waste. These requires heavy duty delivery robots as the weights to carry could be in several hundred pounds (several hundred kilograms).

In Israel, Sheba Medical Center uses delivery robots to shuttle chemotherapy drugs prepared by the pharmacy department directly to the nurses to cut down the waiting time.

Room service

In late 2014, a room service robot named Relay was introduced by a robotics startup company, Savioke. When hotel staff received an order from a guest, the staff would put items inside Relay and the robot would deliver items to the guest room. By 2016, fleets of Relay robots were deployed at five major hotel chains. In August 2017, M Social hotel in Singapore introduced room service robots named AURA to assist staff in tasks such as delivering bottled water and towels to guest rooms. Eating such service outside of the United States.

Companies

Sidewalk Robots 
A number of companies are actively using small robots to do the last-mile delivery of small packages such as food and groceries just using the pedestrian areas of the road and travelling at speed comparable with a fast walking pace, companys actively delivering include

 Starship Technologies - by January 2021 had made over a million deliveries.
 Amazon Scout

Drones 
 Zipline - fixed-wing UAVs delivering medicine and blood supplies via parachute drops; by June 2022 they had made 325,000 deliveries.

Hyundai Motor Group 
On December 13, 2022, Hyundai Motor Group developed a delivery service robot based on electrification and autonomous driving technology. It features a plug-and-drive module with autonomous driving technology to find an optimized route to deliver goods.

Human Interaction 
Being autonomous, the delivery robots primarily interact with the general public without the assistance of a human operator, in both positive and negative encounters. The delivery robot manufacturer Starship Technologies has reported that people kick their robots.  However, the vast majority of human interactions are positive, and many people have anthropomorphized the robots due to their appearance. This has led to encounters where people feel a sense of caring towards the robots, assisting the robots when they are stuck, worrying for the robots on their journeys, or praising or thanking robots for their delivery service.

References

External links

-
Uncrewed vehicles